Bacteriastrum is a genus of diatoms in family Chaetocerotaceae. There are more than 30 described species in genus Bacteriastrum, but many of these are not currently accepted, and new species are still added to the genus. The type species for the genus is Bacteriastrum furcatum Shadbolt.

Description
Bacteriastrum is a widely distributed marine, planktonic genus. This genus is often associated with Chaetoceros but differs in radial symmetry and fenestration of setae. The colonies tend to lie in girdle view, and the cells are separated by the curvature of the basal part of the setae, leaving a small gap between the cells.  The cells are cylindrical and linked to form filaments. Each cell has several long, radiating setae which may be simple or bifurcate (branched), the setae from adjacent cells are fused. The plastids are discoid. At least one species, B. solitarium, exists as single cells.

Species
Bacteriastrum biconicum
Bacteriastrum comosum Pavilliard
Bacteriastrum delicatulum Cleve
Bacteriastrum elegans
Bacteriastrum elongatum Cleve
Bacteriastrum furcatum Shadbolt
Bacteriastrum hyalinum Lauder
Bacteriastrum mediterraneum
Bacteriastrum parallelum D. Sarno, A. Zingone & D. Marino
Bacteriastrum solitarium Mangin
Bacteriastrum varians

See also
Attheya
Chaetoceros

References

Further reading

External links
Algaebase

Coscinodiscophyceae genera